Singular: Act I is the third studio album by American singer Sabrina Carpenter. It was released on November 9, 2018, through Hollywood Records. The album is the follow-up to her  second studio album, Evolution (2016). It is considered the first half of a two-piece project, later being supplemented by her fourth studio album Singular: Act II (2019). Carpenter began writing the album in 2016, shortly after the launch of Evolution but she only began to record the songs in 2017. The album features eight songs, all of which she co-wrote. The compact disc was exclusively released for sale at Target stores. In support of both Singular: Act I and Act II, Carpenter embarked on the Singular Tour in March 2019.

The lead single, "Almost Love", was released on June 6, 2018. "Sue Me" impacted mainstream radio stations in January 2019 as the album's second official single. It was also supported by two promotional singles: "Paris" and "Bad Time", the former of which was released on October 24, 2018, along with the album's pre-order. The singles "Why" and "Alien" were included on the Japanese edition of the album.

The album received critical acclaim from music critics, and debuted at number 103 on the US Billboard 200.

Background 
Carpenter began teasing the album in May 2018 with the release of the album's lead single "Almost Love". On June 2, 2018, Carpenter released a trailer directed by Lauren Dunn, which coincided with her performance of "Almost Love" at Wango Tango. In the trailer, Carpenter announced that the album was called Singular and that it was scheduled for a winter 2018 release. One June 22, 2018, Carpenter revealed in an interview on the Zach Sang Show that her previous two singles "Why" and "Alien" would not appear on the album.  On October 1, 2018, Carpenter performed "Almost Love" on The Late Late Show With James Corden. During the performance, Carpenter ripped off a piece of the set wall revealing a part of the album cover art. Then at the end of the performance, Carpenter spray painted "11/9" on the wall indicating that the album was scheduled for release on November 9, 2018. On October 15, 2018, Carpenter posted a teaser of a song off Singular later revealed to be "Hold Tight". On October 22, 2018, Carpenter formally announced the album and announced that it would be released in two "acts" with Act I being released on November 9, 2018, and Act II "coming soon". She also released Act I's full cover art and track list that day.

Composition 
Musically, Singular: Act I is a dance and dance-pop record, and lyrically, it is about empowering tough, admirable behavior. The album opens with lead single "Almost Love", which Mike Nied of Idolator described as an "edgy anthem". The song contains "intermittent whistles and drums" and is about a relationship ready to take the next step. "Paris" is "an ode to the city of love" that reminds the singer of a Los Angeles lover while in Paris. "Hold Tight" is a "slinky and vaguely retro R&B" song that is the album's sole collaboration. "Sue Me" is described as a "sassy kiss-off" that talks about the end of a relationship. Carpenter has also described the song as representing pure confidence. "Prfct" is a song discussing the reality of love. The song's production puts Carpenter's vocals at the forefront. "Bad Time" is a "synth-driven" song. Nied described "Mona Lisa" as "enticing" and containing "flirty and creative lines." The album's closing track, "Diamonds Are Forever" sees the singer recognizing her worth. It contains soulful vocals from Carpenter. The Line of Best Fit called the song a "theatrical belter."

Critical reception 

Singular Act: I received critical acclaim. Mike Nied of Idolator wrote that the album is an "eight-track collection is jam-packed with bop after bop." He called the album "lush with potential hits" and "another near-perfect work from one of the industry's brightest young stars." Larisha Paul of EarMilk rated the album 9.0 out of ten, giving praise to Carpenter's vocals, writing that "her inarguable dynamic vocal performances that remain consistent in every track is what sets her apart from the rest." The Line of Best Fit rated the album 7.5 out of 10, stating that "it's certainly no small triumph that Singular: Act I stands so firmly by itself – and its creation marks an exciting new phase of an artist properly coming into her own." Lucy Parry from Affinity called the album "a pop masterpiece" and its production "exquisite" also praising the use of more mature themes compared to her previous works.

Singles
The lead single from the album, "Almost Love", was released on June 6, 2018. It reached number 21 on the US Mainstream Top 40 chart and became Carpenter's second song to top the Dance Club Songs chart. "Almost Love" was supplemented with a music video, which was released through Vevo and YouTube on July 13, 2018. It was promoted by live performances at Wango Tango, Good Morning America and The Late Late Show with James Corden.

"Sue Me" was confirmed as the album's second single. It impacted mainstream radio on January 8, 2019. It received a music video on November 16, 2018. Carpenter promoted the single with live performances on The Today Show and Live with Kelly and Ryan. The singles "Why" and "Alien" were included on the Japanese edition of the album, but were removed from the standard track listing.

Promotional singles
The album was made available for pre-order and the first promotional single, titled "Paris", was released on October 24, 2018. The second promotional single "Bad Time" was released on November 2, 2018.

Promotion 
Carpenter embarked on the Singular Tour, beginning in Orlando, Florida on March 2, 2019, in support of the album and its follow up Singular: Act II.

Commercial performance
Singular Act I debuted at number 103 on the Billboard 200 chart, becoming her second lowest charting album on the chart at that time until Singular: Act II debuted at number 138. It also reached number 48 on the UK Download Albums chart, and at number 20 on the Australian Digital Albums.

Track listing

Notes
 signifies an executive producer
 signifies an also vocal producer
 signifies a vocal producer
 signifies a co-producer
 signifies an also remixer
 signifies a remixer

Credits and personnel 
Credits adapted from the liner notes of Singular: Act I.

Recorded, engineered, mixed and mastered at 

 Venice, California 
 Tarzana, California 
 West Hollywood, California 
 Los Angeles, California 
 Stockholm, Sweden 
 Burbank, California 
 Nashville, Tennessee 
 Sydney, Australia 
 Virginia Beach, Virginia 
 New York City, New York

Vocals 

 "Downtown" Trevor Brown – backing vocals 
 Johan Carlsson – backing vocals 
 Sabrina Carpenter – vocals , backing vocals 
 Warren "Oak" Felder – backing vocals 
 Ross Golan – backing vocals 
 Oscar Görres – backing vocals 
 Julia Karlsson – backing vocals 
 Zaire Koalo – backing vocals 
 Rob Persaud – backing vocals 
 Uhmeer – vocals

Instrumentation 

 Nils-Petter Ankarblom – synthesizer strings 
 David Bukovinszky – cello 
 Mattias Bylund – synthesizer pad, strings 
 Johan Carlsson – piano, guitar, synthesizer, tambourine 
 Jason Evigan – instrumentation 
 Oscar Görres – keyboard, bass, guitar, drums, percussion 
 Mattias Johansson – violin 
 The Monsters and the Strangerz – instrumentation 
 Oliver "German" Peterhof – instrumentation 
 Mikkel S. Eriksen – instrumentation,

Production 

 Tim Blacksmith – executive production 
 "Downtown" Trevor Brown – co-production 
 Johan Carlsson – production, vocal production 
 Danny D – executive production 
 Jason Evigan – production, vocal production 
 Warren "Oak" Felder – production 
 Greg "G GOLT" Golterman – production coordination 
 Oscar Görres – production, vocal production 
 Christian "GJ" Johnson – production coordination 
 Zaire Koalo – co-production 
 Jeremy "JBOOGS" Levin – production coordination 
 Brett McLaughlin – vocal production 
 The Monsters and the Strangerz – production 
 Rob Persaud – production 
 Oliver "German" Peterhof – production 
 Mike Sabath – production 
 David "DSLIB" Silberstein – production coordination 
 Stargate – production 
 Gian Stone – vocal production

Technical 

 Nils-Petter Ankarblom – string arrangement 
 William Binderup – mix assistant 
 Tim Brennan – assistant engineering 
 John Bruington – assistant engineering 
 Johan Carlsson – programming, engineering 
 Eric J Dubowsky – mixing 
 Mikkel S. Eriksen – recording, programming, 
 Jason Evigan – programming 
 Warren "Oak" Felder – engineering, programming, 
 Chris Gehringer – mastering 
 Serban Ghenea – mixing 
 Oscar Görres – programming 
 John Hanes – engineering 
 Stefan Johnson – engineering 
 Thomas Kang – assistant engineering 
 Zaire Koalo – drum programming 
 Erik Madrid – mixing  
 The Monsters and the Strangerz – programming 
 Rob Persaud – engineering, mixing 
 Oliver "German" Peterhof – programming 
 Keith "DaQuan" Sorrells – assistant engineering 
 Gian Stone – engineering 
 Thomas Warren – recording 
 Tim Watt – mix assistant

Design
 Amber Park – creative direction, design
 Stijn van Hapert - design
 Elsa Henneke – design
 Amanda Charchian – photography

Charts

Release history

References

2018 albums
Sabrina Carpenter albums
Hollywood Records albums
Albums produced by Jason Evigan
Albums produced by Oak Felder
Albums produced by Johan Carlsson